The 2019 AFF U-15 Women's Championship was the 4th edition of the AFF U-16 Women's Championship, an international women's football tournament organised by the ASEAN Football Federation (AFF). The tournament was hosted by Thailand from 9 to 21 May 2019. The defending champion was Thailand. They managed to retain their title.

Venue

Group stage
The top two teams of each group advanced to the semi-finals. 
All times listed are Thai Standard Time (UTC+07:00)

Group A

Group B

Knockout stage
In the knockout stage, the penalty shoot-outs are used to decide the winner if necessary (extra time is not used).

Semi-finals

Third place match

Final

Winner

Goalscorers

Tournament teams ranking
This table will show the ranking of teams throughout the tournament.

References

2019
International association football competitions hosted by Thailand
Aff U-16 Girls' Championship
Aff U-16 Girls' Championship
W